Ráday is a Hungarian surname. Notable people with the surname include:

 Gedeon Ráday (disambiguation), multiple people
 Imre Ráday (1905–1983), Hungarian actor

Hungarian-language surnames